Rudolf Ludwig Cäsar von Auerswald (1 September 1795 – 15 January 1866) was a German official who served as Prime Minister of Prussia during the Revolution of 1848. Later, during the ministry of Charles Anthony, Prince of Hohenzollern, he led the government in all but name.

Biography
Auerswald was born in Marienwerder (Kwidzyn), West Prussia. He was a member of a Meissen family of nobility, first mentioned in 1263, from Auerswalde, now part of Lichtenau, Saxony. His father was the official Hans Jakob von Auerswald, while his brothers were the general Hans Adolf Erdmann von Auerswald (1792–1848) and the politician Alfred von Auerswald (1797–1870).

A friend of Prince William, much of Auerswald's youth was spent in Königsberg. After the completion of his education he entered the 1. Leibhusarenregiment of the Prussian Army. In 1812 as part of Napoleon's invasion of Russia, Auerswald participated in campaigns in Livonia and Courland under the command of Yorck. He also served from 1813–15 during the wars against Napoleon. Auerswald remained in the military until 1821, when he was discharged as a cavalry captain.

Auerswald married his cousin Countess Adela Dohna-Lauck in 1817. After his discharge from the military he acquired an estate in the Heiligenbeil District of East Prussia, where he became Landrat (district administrator) in 1824. Auerswald became General-Landschaftsrath of the Province of Prussia in 1835 and Oberbürgermeister (roughly Lord Mayor) of Königsberg in 1835.

Auerswald was a member of the knighthood of the East Prussian provincial diet, sometimes with the role of parliamentary marshal (Landtagsmarschall). During a diet paying homage to King Frederick William IV of Prussia, Auerswald was one of the politicians who reminded the new king of the 1815 promise of his predecessor, Frederick William III, to grant a constitution. Auerswald became Regierungspräsident of Regierungsbezirk Trier in 1842.

After the outbreak of the March Revolution in 1848, Auerswald was named Oberpräsident in Königsberg of the Province of Prussia by Prime Minister Ludolf Camphausen. After Camphausen resigned, Auerswald became Prime Minister on 25 June, as well as Foreign Minister. A constitution for the Kingdom of Prussia was proposed during Auerswald's term; its model was the liberal Belgian Constitution of 1831, which had strongly influenced Rhenish liberalism. However, it was not accepted by the Prussian National Assembly, which created its own constitutional committee instead. Auerswald's ministry collapsed on 8 September when the National Assembly called for the government to demand the resignation of conservative members of the military.

After his resignation, Auerswald returned to his post as Oberpräsident in Königsberg. After the dissolution of the National Assembly, the imposition of the constitution of the Kingdom of Prussia and the vote for a new parliament of Prussia led Auerswald to return to national politics. He served as president of the First Chamber (later the Prussian House of Lords) until 1850. Auerswald also participated in the Erfurt Parliament. In 1850 he became Oberpräsident of the Rhine Province, but was forced to resign a year later for remarks critical of the conservative government. Auerswald then spent almost two years out of public office, traveling to Paris, Italy, and North Africa.

Auerswald became a member of the Second Chamber (the Prussian House of Representatives) in 1853 as part of the liberal opposition, owing to his friendship with Crown Prince William. After William's assumption of the Prussian regency and the end of the Manteuffel government, William named Charles Anthony, Prince of Hohenzollern, as Prime Minister. Auerswald served as a minister without portfolio, although he led the government in all but name. Hopes for a more liberal era ended, however, in the face of resistance from the civil service, the court of Regent William, and especially from the House of Representatives.

The military budgetary crisis of 1860 brought Auerswald in opposition to his own liberal party, but he sought a middle ground between William and parliament. The inability to form a compromise caused a splintering of the liberals in 1861. The lack of a liberal majority led to the resignation of Auerswald and a number of ministers in March 1862. The next government was led by Otto von Bismarck.

Auerswald resigned from politics completely. Despite his liberal views and the defeat of the Prussian liberals, he was not disgraced, and a court position as lord burgrave of Marienburg (Malbork) was created for him instead. Auerswald died in Berlin, Brandenburg.

References

 

1795 births
1866 deaths
People from Kwidzyn
Prussian nobility
Prussian Army personnel of the Napoleonic Wars
Members of the Prussian House of Representatives
People from West Prussia
People of the Revolutions of 1848
Prime Ministers of Prussia
Prussian Army personnel
Foreign ministers of Prussia
Member of the Prussian National Assembly